Benjamin Dondem Sesay (born April 18, 1981, in Sierra Leone) is a Sierra Leonean retired footballer who played a striker.

References

External links

1981 births
Living people
Sierra Leonean footballers
Sierra Leonean expatriate footballers
Sierra Leone international footballers
Sportspeople from Freetown
K. Berchem Sport players
Association football forwards
Olympiacos Volos F.C. players
Expatriate footballers in Greece
Expatriate footballers in Belgium
Sierra Leonean expatriate sportspeople in Greece
Sierra Leonean expatriate sportspeople in Belgium
Hoogstraten VV players